Pârșcoveni is a commune in Olt County, Oltenia, Romania. It is composed of three villages: Butoi, Olari and Pârșcoveni. Until 2004, it also included Șopârlița, which that year was split off to form a separate commune.

References

Communes in Olt County
Localities in Oltenia